Len B. Preslar Jr. (born August 13, 1947) is an American business educator who has been a Distinguished Professor of Practice at Wake Forest University since 2009.

Early life and education 
Born in Concord, North Carolina, Preslar was raised in Winston-Salem. He earned a bachelor's degree from High Point University and an MBA from the University of North Carolina at Greensboro.

Career 
Prior to his career in academics, he worked as the CEO and president of the North Carolina Baptist Hospital of 18 years before retiring in 2007.

References

1947 births
Living people
Wake Forest University faculty
People from Concord, North Carolina
People from Winston-Salem, North Carolina
High Point University alumni
University of North Carolina at Greensboro alumni